Breaston Cricket Club is an amateur cricket club based in Breaston, Derbyshire, England. The club has a history dating back to the early 19th century and has played in the South Nottinghamshire Cricket League.

Ground
The Breaston CC home ground is based on the Soldiers and Sailors Sports Ground, Risley Lane, Breaston, Derbyshire.

History
The earliest known record of cricket from Breaston dates back to a match report in the Nottingham Journal between Breaston and Sandiacre, dated 21 October 1836. The site of the original ground is not known, but a field somewhere in the Poplar Road area is locally believed to be the place. In 1908, Breaston started playing on the west side of Sawley Lane until 1932 when the club move just outside of the village boundary to Pegg's field off Wilsthorpe Road, Long Eaton, which is now partially obliterated by the M1 Motorway. By 1939, the club moved back to the western side of Sawley Lane onto a field owned by a Mr A.W. Perks, after being given a 5-year lease and a new pavilion. After a break of activity due to the Second World War, the club led a peripatetic existence until it found a site on Fields Farm, located on the east side of Sawley Lane in 1955. By the early 1960s, the club had to move again after brief spell on West Park, Long Eaton, and moved to what is now known as the Soldiers and Sailors Sports Ground, on Risley Lane.

The club's history shows that its main focus was playing friendly matches, but the occasional appearance in competitive leagues is known. Up until recently, Breaston CC fielded 2 senior teams: a League XI team (1st XI) in the South Nottinghamshire Cricket League, and a Friendly XI team (Sunday 1st XI).

Club Performance
The South Nottinghamshire Cricket League competition results showing the club's positions in the league (by Division) since 2005.

Club Honours

See also
Club cricket

References

External links
 Official Club website
 South Nottinghamshire Cricket League Official Play-Cricket website

English club cricket teams
Cricket in Derbyshire
1836 establishments in England
Club cricket